Yiğitcan Erdoğan (born 13 March 1984) is a Turkish footballer who plays as a defender for Elazığspor.

Career

Elazığspor
On the last day of the January transfermarket 2019, Erdoğan was one of 22 players on two hours, that signed for Turkish club Elazığspor. had been placed under a transfer embargo but managed to negotiate it with the Turkish FA, leading to them going on a mad spree of signing and registering a load of players despite not even having a permanent manager in place. In just two hours, they managed to snap up a record 22 players - 12 coming in on permanent contracts and a further 10 joining on loan deals until the end of the season.

References

Balıkesirspor'da 2 ayrılık, fanatik.com.tr, 2 January 2016

External links

1984 births
Living people
Turkish footballers
Bakırköyspor footballers
İstanbul Başakşehir F.K. players
Orduspor footballers
Altay S.K. footballers
Şanlıurfaspor footballers
Adana Demirspor footballers
Balıkesirspor footballers
Yeni Malatyaspor footballers
Fatih Karagümrük S.K. footballers
Elazığspor footballers
TFF First League players
Süper Lig players
Association football defenders
Turkey under-21 international footballers
Turkey youth international footballers